H-4 Air Base is a Royal Jordanian Air Force base located near Ruwaished in Mafraq Governorate, Jordan.

Overview
This airfield was built to support the H4 oil pumping station of the Mosul–Haifa oil pipeline built by the Iraq Petroleum Company between 1932 and 1934 in the Emirate of Transjordan at that time a protectorate of the British Empire. The airfield was used by the RAF during World War II as the Advanced Headquarters for operations against the rebels in Iraq during the Anglo-Iraqi War. The Airbase is now operated by the Royal Jordanian Air Force.

Between November 2014 and January 2015, the United States began positioning MQ-9 Reaper UAVs at the base.

The base also houses AH-1F Cobras, believed to be from the 10th and 12th Squadrons of the Royal Jordanian Air Force, and a Cessna 208B Caravan from the 15th Squadron.

Notes

References

Airports in Jordan
Military installations of Jordan